Ekain Zenitagoia Arana (born 29 April 1994), simply known as Ekain, is a Spanish professional footballer who plays as a forward for UD Ibiza.

Club career
Ekain was born in Durango, Biscay, Basque Country, and finished his formation with hometown side SCD Durango. He made his senior debut with Iurretako KT in 2013, in the regional leagues, before returning to Cultu in 2015.

Ekain scored a career-best 18 goals for Durango during the 2017–18 season, as his club returned to Segunda División B after 12 years. He scored a further eight times in the following campaign, but could not prevent his team's relegation.

On 19 June 2019, Ekain signed for SD Amorebieta in the third division. On 13 August 2020, after scoring nine goals, he moved to fellow league team UD Ibiza.

Mainly used as a substitute, Ekain scored Ibiza's goal in a 1–0 win over UCAM Murcia CF on 23 May 2021, which sealed the club's first-ever promotion to Segunda División. He made his professional debut at the age of 27 on 13 August, starting in a 0–0 away draw against Real Zaragoza.

References

External links
 
 
 

1994 births
Living people
Footballers from Durango
Spanish footballers
Association football forwards
Segunda División players
Segunda División B players
Tercera División players
Divisiones Regionales de Fútbol players
SD Amorebieta footballers
UD Ibiza players